The FPS Chancellery of the Prime Minister is a Federal Public Service in Belgium. It is comparable to the Chancellery of the Federal Chancellor of Germany. It was created as the FPS Chancellery and General Services by Royal Order on 15 May 2001, as part of the plans of the Verhofstadt I Government to modernise the federal administration. Its name was changed by Royal Order on 4 September 2002.

The Chancellery of the Prime Minister is responsible for assisting the Prime Minister with leading and coordinating the government policy.

External links
 Website of the Chancellery of the Prime Minister
 Website of the Prime Minister of Belgium

Chancellery
Ministries established in 2001
2001 establishments in Belgium